Friday Zico (born 1 November 1994) is an Australian South Sudanese professional footballer who plays as   a left back for Gwelup Croatia SC in the National Premier Leagues Western Australia.

Personal life
Zico was born in a town called Magwi in South Sudan), and spent his early life in a refugee camp near the Ugandan city of Gulu, after his parents fled the Sudanese Civil War. In 2004, he and his family were accepted as refugees by Australia, and settled in the city of Perth, where he attended Melville Senior High School. Zico started playing football age 12 for Fremantle United SC in 2006 spending 3 years in the club youth system before moving to club Cockburn City Soccer club to further his education in the game in 2009. In 2010 Zico made another move to Melville City FC playing for their Men's Reserve Team in which he collected Player Of The Year and club Top goal Scorer in the Reserve League. In 2011 Zico signed with Fremantle City State League Division One. In 2012 Zico performance attracted the attention of Football West National Training Centre coach Kenny Lowe who offered Zico a scholarship in the National Development Squad.

International career

On 8 June 2015 Zico made his debut as second-half substitute for South Sudan National team in an International friendly match against Kenya which ended in a 2–0 defeat. 5 days later on 13 June 2015 Zico made his full International appearance against Mali in South Sudan first ever 2017 Africa Cup of Nations qualification match which Mali won 2–0. On 1 September 2015 Zico was called up to the South Sudan national football team training camp to prepare for their 2017 African cup of Nation qualification match against Equatorial Guinea, however Zico sustained a serious knee injury during training damaging his anterior cruciate ligament, posterior cruciate ligament, medial cruciate ligament, and lateral cruciate ligament which kept him out of action for three years, there was a possibility doctor said he may never play again. On 16 October 2018, Zico made his return on the international stage playing against Gabon in the 2019 African Cup Of Nation Qualifier group Stage, playing 90 minutes of the match, Gabon went on to win the game 1–0 in South Sudan. On 16 November 2018 Friday Zico started in South Sudan second last game of the African cup of nations 2019 qualifiers against Burundi in a very disappointing match resulting in a 5–2 loss in Juba, South Sudan.

External links

CAF Online

References

1994 births
Living people
Association football defenders
South Sudanese footballers
South Sudan international footballers
National Premier Leagues players
South Sudanese emigrants to Australia
People educated at Melville Senior High School
Soccer players from Perth, Western Australia
Australian soccer players
Refugees in Australia
Perth SC players
Armadale SC players